Party, Fun, Love, and Radio EP is the third EP by American rock band We the Kings. It was released on July 3, 2012.

Track listing

References

External links

Party, Fun, Love, and Radio at YouTube (streamed copy where licensed)

We the Kings EPs
2012 EPs